Yury Alexandrovich Alexandrov (born June 24, 1988) is a Russian professional ice hockey defenceman currently playing as an alternate captain for HC Sochi in the Kontinental Hockey League (KHL).

Playing career
A defenceman, Alexandrov was drafted 37th overall by the Boston Bruins in the second round of the 2006 NHL Entry Draft. He debuted with his hometown Severstal Cherepovets of the then-Russian Hockey Super League in their 2005-06 season. On May 30, 2010, Alexandrov signed a two-year $1.5 million, entry level, two-way contract with the Boston Bruins of the National Hockey League. Alexandrov played the 2010–11 season in the American Hockey League with the Providence Bruins.

On August 29, 2011, Alexandrov opted to end his North American career, and returned to the KHL in signing a multi-year contract with SKA Saint Petersburg.

Career statistics

Regular season and playoffs

International

References

External links

 
 
 

1988 births
Avangard Omsk players
Boston Bruins draft picks
Living people
People from Cherepovets
Providence Bruins players
Russian ice hockey defencemen
Severstal Cherepovets players
SKA Saint Petersburg players
HC Sochi players
Sportspeople from Vologda Oblast